Felimare lilyeveae is a species of colourful sea slug or dorid nudibranch, a marine gastropod mollusk in the family Chromodorididae.

Distribution 
This species occurs in the Caribbean Sea and off the Lesser Antilles.

Description 

Habitat 
Reported from  depth.

References

Chromodorididae
Gastropods described in 2006